The Supreme Council of Government was a military junta which, de facto, exercised the role of head of state and head of government of the Republic of Ecuador from 1976 to 1979, being considered the last military dictatorship in the history of Ecuador.

Formed following the ousting of dictator Guillermo Rodríguez, the Council consisted of three members, representing each branch of the Armed Forces: Admiral Alfredo Poveda as representative of the Navy and President of the Council, Divisional General Guillermo Durán Arcentales as representative of the Army and General Luis Leoro Franco as representative of the Air Force.

See also 
 1978 Ecuadorian constitutional referendum
 1978–1979 Ecuadorian general election

References 

Military history of Ecuador
Political history of Ecuador
Government of Ecuador
Military dictatorships